Roberto Skyers Pérez (born 12 November 1991 in Minas, Camagüey) is a Cuban track and field athlete who competes in the sprinting events. He won the gold medal in the 200 metres at the 2011 Pan American Games. His personal bests are 9.98 seconds for the 100 metres and 20.02 seconds for the 200 m.

Career

At the age of seventeen, he ran a national junior record of 20.24 seconds for the 200 metres that year and also ran a 100 metres best of 10.31 seconds. This represented a significant improvement upon his 2008 best of 21.65 seconds and led to athletics statisticians A. Lennart Julin and Mirko Jalava identifying him as one of the world's most promising sprinters. Skyers began competing internationally in 2009, making his debut at the ALBA Games, where he claimed the 200 m title. He ran in the Cuban 4×100 metres relay team at the 2009 Central American and Caribbean Championships in Athletics, but the quartet failed to finish the race. He claimed the 200 m national title at the Barrientos Memorial in June.

Having finished third at the 2010 Barrientos meet and improved his 100 m to 10.29 seconds, Skyers represented Cuba in that event at the 2010 Ibero-American Championships and went on to place fourth overall. He completed a 200 m and relay double at the 2011 ALBA Games the following July. He established himself on the regional scene at the 2011 Pan American Games: although he suffered a muscular twitch during the heats of the relay, he ran in the 200 m a few hours later and was the surprise gold medalist in the event, defeating Lansford Spence and Bruno de Barros.

Personal bests
100 m: 9.98 s (wind: +1.0 m/s) –  Camagüey, 22 feb 2019
200 m: 20.02 s NR (wind: +0.3 m/s) –  Toronto, 24 July 2015

International competitions

1Did not finish in the semifinals

References

External links

Sports reference biography
Tilastopaja biography
Ecured biography (in Spanish)

Living people
1991 births
Cuban male sprinters
Athletes (track and field) at the 2012 Summer Olympics
Athletes (track and field) at the 2016 Summer Olympics
Olympic athletes of Cuba
Pan American Games medalists in athletics (track and field)
Pan American Games gold medalists for Cuba
Athletes (track and field) at the 2011 Pan American Games
People from Camagüey Province
Athletes (track and field) at the 2015 Pan American Games
Athletes (track and field) at the 2019 Pan American Games
World Athletics Championships athletes for Cuba
Central American and Caribbean Games gold medalists for Cuba
Competitors at the 2014 Central American and Caribbean Games
Central American and Caribbean Games medalists in athletics
Medalists at the 2011 Pan American Games
21st-century Cuban people